M. gracile  may refer to:
 Melampodium gracile, a flowering plant species
 Moeritherium gracile, a prehistoric mammal species that lived during the Eocene epoch